Atlantis Software was a London-based UK computer games publisher that published a number of games during the 1980s and early 1990s.

The company was set up by Michael Cole and Rodger Coghill in January 1984 with the first four games released in May of that year. The philosophy of the company was to sell high volume at low 'pocket-money' prices: initially, all games were £1.99. The Atlantis Gold label was launched the following year at £2.99, but the Gold tag was soon dropped, with games at both prices being released under the  Atlantis logo but with the suggested price on the cover.

The company's primary focus remained on the low-cost cassette-based games for 8-bit machines for £1.99 and £2.99 (commonly known as "budget" games) that formed a significant part of the UK 8-bit software market during the 1980s.

However, they later published games for the 16-bit disk-based Atari ST and Commodore Amiga formats.

Formats covered included the ZX Spectrum on which they published several games reviewed by the UK gaming press.

Selected titles
Master Mariner, 1984 (ZX Spectrum)
Monster Munch, 1984 (Commodore 64)
Cops 'n' Robbers, 1985 (VIC-20, C64, Commodore 16, Acorn Electron, BBC Micro, Atari 8-bit)
Death Race, 1985 (VIC-20, C64, C16, Atari 8-bit)
League Challenge, 1986 (Spectrum, C64, C16, Electron, BBC, Atari 8-bit, Amstrad CPC, Amiga, Atari ST)
Survivors, 1986 (Spectrum, C64, C16, Electron, BBC, Atari 8-bit, CPC, MSX)
Panik!, 1986 (C16, Electron, BBC, Atari 8-bit)
Gunfighter, 1988 (Spectrum, C64, Electron, BBC, Atari 8-bit, CPC)
Crack-Up!, 1989 (Spectrum, C64, Electron, BBC, Atari 8-bit, CPC)
Encounter!, 1989 (Atari 8-bit, Commodore 64)
Cavemania, 1990 (Spectrum, C64, CPC, Amiga, ST)
Hobgoblin, 1990 (Spectrum, C64, Electron, BBC, CPC)
Apache Flight, 1992 (Amiga, ST)

Dates shown are for the first version. In many cases, ports to other machines were released over a number of years (e.g. League Challenge wasn't ported to Amiga until 1991).

References

External links

 Atlantis Software Game Cover Gallery on Retromuseums
 Atlantis Softology on Retromuseums

Defunct video game companies of the United Kingdom